The 2016 AFL season was the 120th season of the Australian Football League (AFL), the highest level senior Australian rules football competition in Australia, which was known as the Victorian Football League until 1989.

The season featured eighteen clubs, ran from 24 March until 1 October, and comprised a 22-game home-and-away season followed by a finals series featuring the top eight clubs. Thirty-four players, seventeen of whom were still active in the league, missed the season through suspension by the World Anti-Doping Agency, for doping infringements which occurred at the Essendon Football Club as part of its 2012 sports supplements program.

The premiership was won by the Western Bulldogs for the second time, after it defeated  by 22 points in the 2016 AFL Grand Final.

Pre-season

NAB Challenge

For the third consecutive year, the NAB Challenge series took place, featuring 27 practice matches played over 25 days, which began on 18 February and ended on 13 March. The matches were stand-alone, with no overall winner of the series. Each team played three games, many of which were played at suburban or regional venues, with all games televised on Fox Footy. The super goal was retained for these pre-season matches.

Rule changes
The following rule changes were made for the 2016 season:
The interchange rules were significantly altered to give each team four interchange players and a maximum of 90 rotations per game (excluding concussion, blood rule and stretcher interchanges). This replaced the 2015 protocol in which teams had three interchange players and a substitute and a maximum of 120 rotations per game.
The scope of tackles covered by the existing 'dangerous tackles' rule was expanded, with both umpires and the tribunal more strictly penalising players for tackles including a lifting, slinging or rotating technique.
A stricter interpretation of the existing "deliberate out of bounds" rule is to be applied.
The width of the protected zone on either side of a player with a mark or free kick was increased from five metres to ten metres. The rule was trialled in the 2016 pre-season before being endorsed shortly for the premiership season.
A provision for the AFL to appeal to the tribunal against an inadequate penalty will be introduced; previously, players had the right to appeal their charges or penalties but the AFL did not have the right to appeal against an acquittal or lenient penalty.
A thirty-second countdown clock, within which a player taking a set shot must begin their approach, was displayed on the scoreboard at most AFL grounds. This replaced the previous system in which the umpire was responsible for judging the thirty second time limit. The change was not implemented at grounds which lacked existing infrastructure to support it. From round 9 onwards, the shot clock was not shown during the final two minutes of any quarter to prevent it from being actively used in end-of-game clock management.
The grand final replay was abolished, with the provisions which were introduced in 1991 for five minutes each way of extra time in drawn finals now also applying to a drawn grand final. A new provision was also introduced to all finals to allow for an untimed period of golden point extra time to decide the game if scores remained level after extra time.
All matches during rounds 13, 14 and 15 (the bye rounds) featured a trial of officiating matches with four field umpires instead of three.

Premiership season
Notable features of the draw include:
Due to the weighted rule,  and  met only once in the regular season for the first time since 1991, on Anzac Day.
Due to poor results in the Friday night timeslot in 2015,  did not feature on Friday nights during the regular season, but still contested the annual Thursday night season opener against  in round 1.
 and  again met on Anzac Eve, which this season fell on a Sunday night. It was the only Sunday night match for the season, with the timeslot's unpopularity causing it to be scrapped after the 2014 season. The New Zealand Anzac Day match was scrapped from the fixture.
Due to the Sydney Royal Easter Show, 's primary home ground (Spotless Stadium) was unavailable until round 6, therefore the club's first two home games were played at its secondary home ground, Manuka Oval.
One month prior to the season, the Sydney Swans and ANZ Stadium came to an agreement to end their contract one year earlier than its scheduled conclusion, resulting in all eleven Sydney home games being played at the Sydney Cricket Ground, instead of eight at the SCG and three at ANZ Stadium. ANZ Stadium was still used for finals matches during 2016.
There was a bye round between round 23 and the first week of the finals, to encourage teams participating in the finals to field their strongest side possible ahead of their first final. It was since announced in February 2016 that the annual E. J. Whitten Legends Game would be played in the football-free weekend, shifting from its mid-season slot.
All starting times are local.

Round 1

Round 2

Round 3

Round 4

Round 5

Round 6

Round 7

Round 8

Round 9

Round 10

Round 11

Round 12

Round 13

Round 14

Round 15

Round 16

Round 17

Round 18

Round 19

Round 20

Round 21

Round 22

Round 23

Win/loss table

Bold – Home game
X – Bye
Opponent for round listed above margin

Ladder

Ladder progression
Numbers highlighted in green indicates the team finished the round inside the top 8.
Numbers highlighted in blue indicates the team finished in first place on the ladder in that round.
Numbers highlighted in red indicates the team finished in last place on the ladder in that round.
Underlined numbers indicates the team did not play during that round, either due to a bye or a postponed game.
Subscript numbers indicate ladder position at round's end.

Positions of teams round by round

Finals series

Week one

Week two

Week three

Week four

Attendances

By club

By ground

Awards
He broke Dane Swan's 2011 record for the most votes by any player under the 3-2-1 voting system, until the record was broken a year later by Dustin Martin.
The McClelland Trophy was awarded to Sydney for the first time since 2014.
The AFL Players Association Awards
The Leigh Matthews Trophy was awarded to Patrick Dangerfield of Geelong.
The Robert Rose Award was awarded to Luke Parker of Sydney for the second consecutive year.
The best first year player was awarded to Callum Mills of Sydney.
The 22under22 team captaincy was awarded to Marcus Bontempelli of the Western Bulldogs.
The AFL Coaches Association Awards
The AFL Coaches Association Player of the Year Award was awarded to Patrick Dangerfield of Geelong, who received 121 votes.
The inaugural Gary Ayres Award for the best player in the finals series was awarded to Josh Kennedy of Sydney.
The Allan Jeans Senior Coach of the Year Award was awarded to Luke Beveridge of the Western Bulldogs for the second consecutive year.
The Assistant Coach of the Year Award was awarded to Stuart Dew of Sydney.
The Lifetime Achievement Award was awarded to Mark Williams.
The Best Young Player Award was awarded to Isaac Heeney of Sydney.
The Media Award was awarded to Gerard Whateley for his work on Fox Footy and the Australian Broadcasting Corporation.
The Jim Stynes Community Leadership Award was awarded to Jimmy Bartel of Geelong.

Milestones

Coleman Medal

Numbers highlighted in blue indicates the player led the Coleman that round.
Underlined numbers indicates the player did not play that round.

Best and fairest

Club leadership

Coach changes

Club financials

Notable events

Essendon supplements scandal

On 12 January 2016, after appealing the AFL anti-doping tribunal's verdict that 34 past and present  players were found not guilty of taking an illegal substance during the 2012 season, the Court of Arbitration for Sport returned a final verdict of guilty; as a result, these players, including twelve still at the club, five at another as well as 17 players who are currently playing at lower levels or have retired altogether, were suspended for the entire season.

References

External links
Official AFL website

Australian Football League seasons
 
2016 in Australian rules football